During the 2002–03 Italian football season, Bologna F.C. 1909 competed in the Serie A.

Season summary
Bologna F.C. 1909 finished the season in 11th position in the Serie A table. In other competitions, Bologna reached the quarter finals of the Coppa Italia.

Giuseppe Signori was the top scorer for Bologna with 12 goals in all competitions.

Squad

Transfers

Winter

Competitions

Serie A

League table

Results by round

Matches

Coppa Italia

Eightfinals

UEFA Intertoto Cup

Quarterfinals

Semifinals

Finals

Statistics

Players statistics

References

Bologna F.C. 1909 seasons
Bologna